The Cyprus Police, is the National Police Service of the Republic of Cyprus and is under the Ministry of Justice and Public Order since 1993.

The duties and responsibilities of the Cyprus Police are set out in the amended Police Law (N.73(1)) of 2004 and include the maintenance of Law and Order, the prevention and detection of crime as well as arresting and bringing offenders to justice.

History
Although the history of Law enforcement in Cyprus goes back to 1879 when the first Police Law was passed by the then British Colonial Government, which operated a mounted gendarmerie force known as the Cyprus Military Police, the history of the Cyprus Police begins with the establishment of the Republic of Cyprus in 1960.

In 1960 two Public Security Forces were established within the framework of the Constitution: the Police Force, which was responsible for policing the urban areas, and the Gendarmerie, which was responsible for policing rural areas. A Greek-Cypriot Chief and a Turkish-Cypriot Chief administered the two Forces respectively.

The two forces of the police were joined to form the present police service during the year 1964, shortly after the intercommunal troubles between the Greek and the Turkish communities, as a result of which the Turkish Cypriot officers abandoned their posts. Additionally the conflict created great problems for the police, who had to handle the situation, along with the then sparsely manned Cypriot Army, because it was the only organized force.

With the creation of the Cypriot National Guard in 1964, the duties of military nature were transferred to the National Guard and the police was limited back to its usual duties.

Also notable is that a museum dedicated to the history of the Cyprus Police and Law enforcement in Cyprus in general exists, with a history of its own. The Cyprus Police Museum, owned by the Cyprus Police and managed by the Department A' of the Police Headquarters is open to the general public.

Authorities
The Cyprus Police operates and exercises its authorities throughout the territory of the Republic of Cyprus based on the following Laws and Regulations:

 The Constitution of the Republic of Cyprus
 Police Law (N.73(I)/2004)
 Police Regulations
 Police Standing Orders
 Criminal Code Cap.154
 Criminal Procedure Law Cap.155
 Evidence Law Cap-9
 The Processing of Personal Data (Protection of the Individual) Law 138(1)/2001

The legal framework within which the Cyprus Police exists and operates is determined by the Constitution, Police Law Cap.285 and other laws that provide the authority for investigation, detention, arrest, questioning and prosecution of offenders of the Law.

Structure and organisation
The structure and organisation of the Cyprus Police is governed by Police Ordinance 1/10 and is formed as stated below:

Headquarters
The Police Headquarters is divided into different Departments/Directorates/Services and Units, each specializing in a different field/aspect of policing.

Departments
Department A' (Administration)
Department B' (Traffic, Transport)
Department C' (Criminal Investigations, Prosecutors)
Department D' (Scientific & Technical Support)
Research and Development Department

Directorates
European Union & International Police Cooperation Directorate
Materials & Supplies Management Directorate
Airports Security Directorate
Finance Directorate
Directorate of Professional Standards

Services
Aliens & Immigration Service
Drug Law Enforcement Service
Forensic Investigations Service
Audit & Inspection Service
Central Intelligence Service

Units
Cyprus Police Academy
Emergency Response Unit
Presidential Guard Unit
Port & Marine Police
Cyprus Police Aviation Unit (Previously named Police Air Wing)

Divisions

The Cyprus Police has one Division for each district of Cyprus. Under this divisions are the Police Stations but also within each Police Division, branches can be created similar to the branches of the Police Headquarters. For example, there is a Headquarters Drug Law Enforcement Service but also a Nicosia, Limassol etc. Drug Law Enforcement Service. Other examples include Headquarters Criminal Investigation Department (C.I.D.)- Larnaca, Nicosia, Limassol etc. C.I.D. and Headquarters Traffic Department  - Nicosia, Limassol etc. Traffic Department . The difference is that the Headquarters units/services etc. operate throughout the territory of the Cyprus Republic while the divisional (provincial) units/services operate mostly within the District that are located.

Nicosia
Limassol
Larnaca
Famagusta
Paphos
Keryneia
Morphou
Fire Service - The Fire Service used to operate as an independent Division based in Nicosia but with national coverage up to 15/10/2021 that was established as an independent service. 

Because of the Turkish invasion and continuing occupation, the Police Divisional Headquarters of Famagusta and Morphou are temporarily housed in Paralimni and Evrychou respectively, while the Kyrenia Police Division has temporarily suspended its operation.

Emergency Response Unit 
The Emergency Response Unit (E.R.U) is a unit of the Cyprus Police, the national police of the Republic of Cyprus. The mission and responsibilities of the Emergency Response Unit are closely interwoven with the security of the State, the maintenance of law and order and the provision of help and services to the public. The characteristic features of this unit are discipline, training, team-work, team-spirit and thorough organisation. Its Commander is accountable to the Chief of Police through the Assistant Chief of Police in charge of Support.

The Emergency Response Unit, known up until recently as the Mobile Immediate Action Unit, which was a direct translation of its name in Greek, was set up in 1978 after a government decision. The Government at the time responded to an increase in terrorism in the Eastern Mediterranean, as well as to a number of incidents of terrorism that took place in Cyprus. The first commander of the unit was Costas Papacostas, a National Guard Major, who was transferred to the Police. Moreover, the first members of the unit had previous service in the Special Forces of the National Guard.

Mission
The primary mission of the Emergency Response Unit is the operational support of policing throughout the Republic in combating organised, violent acts or crimes such as terrorism. It is also responsible for providing protection to VIPs and suppressing riots.

The secondary mission of the Emergency Response Unit is the provision of aid, services and rescue in cases of natural disasters or major accidents.

The unit also supports all other police departments and divisional headquarters in carrying out their operations.

Structure and organization
The Emergency Response Unit is split into several branches to better handle the operations that are assigned to the Unit.

Personnel

Ranks and insignia
Below is a table showing the Cyprus police ranks in hierarchical order along with their identification markings and insignia.

Special Constable

Special Constables are recruited separately from regular Constables and in accordance with Article 39 of the Police Law (N.73 (I) / 2004) they are recruited for clerical and auxiliary duties, guard duties of publicly owned buildings and facilities, VIPs and foreign missions protection and for the delivery and execution of court orders and / or any other orders.

Article 41 of the Police Law (N.73 (I) / 2004) states that any Special Constable appointed under this Act, shall perform the duties assigned to him and, in the exercise of his duties, has same powers, the same privileges, the same protection and is subject to the same penalties and to the same principles as regular Constables.

Special Constables are usually referred to as "Special", even in Greek, and rarely as "" (usually in more formal references) which is short for the Greek title "". The curriculum of Special Constables at the Police Academy is less than the curriculum of regular Constables and also shorter in duration. The pay grade that the Special Constables enter the police is lower in relation to the pay grade that the regular Constables enter.

A Special Constable cannot be "promoted to a regular Constable". Instead Special Constables wishing to enter the Cyprus Police as regular Constables have to go through the same recruitment process as anyone else, including any written or physical condition exams, irrelevant of the years that they have been already working in the Cyprus Police and irrelevant of the fact that they might be transferred after completion of their training as regular Constables back to the position they were serving as Special Constables. An exception on the age of entry was made for Special Constables that were already serving in the police before the enforcement of Police Law of 2004. The enrolment age restrictions for regular Constables, applies to Special Constables wishing to enroll as regular Constables if they were recruited after the date that the Police Law of 2004 was enforced.

Constable

Constable is the entry rank in the Cyprus Police. This rank represents the largest percentage of Police Officers serving in the Cyprus Police. All police officers begin their careers at this rank (with the exception of the specialized personnel that enter the police under a different agreement).

Senior Constable

A Senior Constable is not considered a promotion. Senior Constables are Constables assigned duties higher to their rank level, they are called Senior Constables and bear the distinctive insignia. To become a Senior Constable a Constable must meet the following requirements:
They have completed 12 years of service and have passed the examination for promotion to the rank of Sergeant
During the last two years they have not been imposed with a penalty greater than "severe reprimand" for a disciplinary offence and
they have been recommended by the officer in charge of their Unit as suitable and well trained in police duties

Acting Sergeant / Acting Sergeant Senior Constable

Under Regulation 213/2004, the Chief of Police may, at any time he considers that the needs of the service so require for a short period of time, to select any Constable who is qualified for promotion to Sergeant and assign him to Sergeant duties for a period not exceeding three months but in no event exceeding for the same person a total of two years. Such a person is called Acting Sergeant. After this time period ends, this person reverts to the rank of Constable or Senior Constable respectively, depending on what he was before his assignment as Acting Sergeant. Before the implementation of Regulation 213/2004 this appointment was permanent and not temporary. In 2019 the Rank and Rank Insignia of Acting Sergeant Senior Constable was abolished.

Sergeant

Sergeant is the first rank a Constable is promoted to. Usually sergeants are in charge of a specific shift at a police station, a squad or a small team.

Senior Sergeant

A Senior Sergeant is not considered a promotion. Senior Sergeants are Sergeants assigned duties higher to their rank level, they are called Senior Sergeants and bear the distinctive insignia. To become a Senior Sergeant a Sergeant must meet the following requirements:
They have completed 8 years of service at the rank of Sergeant and have passed the examination for promotion to the rank of Inspector
During the last two years they have not been imposed with a penalty greater than "severe reprimand" for a disciplinary offence and
they have been recommended by the officer in charge of their Unit as suitable and well trained in police duties

Education and training
All police constables (PCs) have to attend a three-year course at the Cyprus Police Academy, which is recognized as a higher education institution. The course alternates between theory at the Police Academy and practical training in the field. Special police constables (SPCs) also attend the police academy for a seventeen-week course.  All PCs and SPCs, as part of their training attend the Special Training Center of the Emergency Response Unit for firearms training and other physical forms of training.

The highly variable field of law enforcement demands and highly promotes continuing education.  For this reason police officers of all ranks continue attending courses throughout their careers.  Such courses are conducted by the Cyprus Police Academy or by foreign training agencies such as the FBI National Academy and the National Security School of the Greek Police Academy.  The duration of these courses is from a couple of days, up to several months or in some cases more than a year.  To assist cross-border common training, exist the Cyprus Police is a member of many international programs and agencies, for example CEPOL.

Equipment

Vehicles

Markings
Cyprus Police cars are white with a blue stripe that goes around the car. They also have the logo of the Cyprus Police, usually on the front doors and also have printed on them the Police’s website www.police.gov.cy. An exception to this is some of the cars used by the Neighbourhood Police that have the Neighbourhood Police logo instead of the Cyprus Police Logo. On the roof they have printed a distinct number for each one as aerial roof markings.

In 2011 a trial version for new markings was used on an old Opel Vectra patrol car. These were half-Battenburg markings with a highly reflective blue-yellow stripe on the sides instead of the solid blue stripe. Additionally the back was covered in reflective yellow-red diagonal stripes and had printed the emergency phone number 112. The front part on the hood of the car had the words  and POLICE printed inverted so that they would appear correctly when seen through a mirror. These markings were not enforced.

In 2012 new markings were enforced were the blue stripe although still solid was replaced with a highly reflective one, and the rear horizontal line was replaced from a solid blue stripe to a blue-white diagonal line similar to the rear usually found on vehicles with Battenburg markings.

The Cyprus Police also uses unmarked vehicles. Unmarked vehicles are not necessarily covert to be used for undercover work. Most unmarked cars are the same models as the patrol cars and they are mostly used by plain clothed officers such as crime investigators, crime prevention squads, technicians etc. Most of these cars are fitted with sirens and can be seen in the streets with detachable strobe lights.

Lists of vehicles

*Unless specifically referenced, the dates the vehicles entered service are based on their license plate registration numbers

*Unless specifically referenced, the dates the vehicles entered service are based on their license plate registration numbers

Aerial vehicles

Boats

Gallery

See also

Cyprus Civil Defence
Cyprus Fire Service
Cyprus Joint Rescue Coordination Center
Cyprus Police Academy
Cyprus Police Aviation Unit
Cyprus Police Museum
Cyprus Port & Marine Police
Cyprus Prisons Department
Hellenic Police
Sovereign Base Areas Customs
Sovereign Base Areas Police
Cyprus Joint Police Unit

References

External links
Official website

Police